Gleneagles Hospital Hong Kong (formerly Gleneagles Hong Kong Hospital) is a multi-specialty private hospital in Wong Chuk Hang, Hong Kong. The 500-bed hospital is a joint venture between Singapore-based Parkway Pantai and Hong Kong-listed NWS Holdings, with The University of Hong Kong being the hospital’s exclusive clinical partner. The hospital opened on 21 March 2017. Gleneagles is also a full-scale teaching hospital, offering clinical training to medical students of HKU Medical Faculty.

Background
Gleneagles Hospital Hong Kong is built on the site of the former Nam Fung temporary housing area in Wong Chuk Hang. The area was cleared in 1994.

In 2009, the Hong Kong government invited local and overseas organisations to submit expressions of interest for the development of private hospitals at four sites. Wong Chuk Hang was the most popular site with 12 organisations showing interest. One of the tendering terms required that 30 per cent of services must be provided at standard package prices.

The site eventually was awarded to GHK Hospital Limited for HK$1.69 billion in 2013. Parkway Pantai and NWS Holdings contributed 60 and 40 per cent respectively of the total investment cost of approximately HK$5 billion.

Gleneagles opened its first satellite medical clinic, Gleneagles Medical Clinic Central, Hong Kong, on 1 March 2019, providing a range of services including general and specialist outpatient consultation, health screening services, vaccination etc. The Clinic was expanded and relocated to New World Centre in Central in October 2020 to accommodate continuous growth in demand. It offers services of diverse specialties covering Cardiology, Family Medicine, Gastroenterology and Hepatology, General Surgery, Geriatric Medicine, Ophthalmology, Orthopaedics, Otorhinolaryngology, Paediatrics, Respiratory Medicine and more.

Management
Gleneagles Hospital Hong Kong is a joint venture between Singapore-based Parkway Pantai and Hong Kong-listed NWS Holdings. The University of Hong Kong is the exclusive clinical partner of Gleneagles and is responsible for clinical governance.

The hospital is managed by Parkway Pantai, one of Asia’s largest integrated private healthcare groups. For over 40 years, its Mount Elizabeth, Gleneagles, Pantai and Parkway brands have established themselves as the region’s best known brands in private healthcare. It is part of IHH Healthcare Berhad, the world’s second largest healthcare group by market capitalisation. IHH operates more than 15,000 licensed beds across 80 hospitals in 10 countries worldwide.

Facilities and Services 
Gleneagles aspires to bring high-quality and accessible healthcare to the people of Hong Kong through introducing transparent pricing. It is the first private hospital in Hong Kong to launch all-inclusive medical packages. The fee of each package covers all costs associated with the specified surgery or procedure, including costs due to complications. 

The hospital's clinical services span across more than 35 specialties and subspecialties. Its facilities and services include:

24 hours emergency department
Cardiology / Cardiac Catheterisation Laboratory 
Cardiothoracic surgery
Chemotherapy Centre
Clinical Laboratory
Critical Care Unit 
Dietetic Services
Endoscopy Centre 
Neonatal Intensive Care Unit & Special Baby Care Unit 
Operating Theatres
Pharmacy Services
Radiotherapy & Oncology Services
Radiology Services
Rehabilitation Services
Renal Dialysis
Sample Collection Centre 

Specialist Outpatient Clinics 
Behavioural Health
Breast
Cardiology
Chinese Medicine
Family Medicine
General Medicine
General Surgery
Haematology & Oncology
Health Screening 
Neurology & Neurosurgery
Obstetrics & Gynaecology
Ophthalmology / Eye
Orthopaedic Surgery
Otorhinolaryngology / Ear, Nose & Throat
Paediatrics
Skin & Laser 
Urology

References

External links

 Gleneagles Hospital Hong Kong Official Website

Hospitals in Hong Kong